Vobtusine is an alkaloid found in several different plants in the genus Voacanga.

See also 
Apparicine
Affinisine
Voacamine
Lochnericine

References 

Indole alkaloids
Alkaloids found in Apocynaceae